Morawki  is a village in the administrative district of Gmina Błaszki, within Sieradz County, Łódź Voivodeship, in central Poland.

The village has an approximate population of 200.

References

Morawki